The San Diego Tigers were a Negro league baseball team in the West Coast Negro Baseball League, based in San Diego, California, in 1946.

References

Negro league baseball teams
Baseball teams in San Diego
Defunct baseball teams in California
Baseball teams disestablished in 1946
Baseball teams established in 1946